is a commuter railway station on the Enoshima Electric Railway (Enoden) located in the city of Fujisawa, Kanagawa Prefecture, Japan.

Lines
Ishigami Station is served by the Enoshima Electric Railway Main Line and is 0.6 kilometers from the terminus of the line at Fujisawa Station.

Station layout
The station consists of a single side platform serving one track for bi-directional traffic. There is no station building and the station is unattended.

Platforms

History 
From 1902–1944, an "Ishigami Signal Stop" existed to the north of the present station. This stop, as well as Takasuna Station were closed in 1944 during World War II. Takasuna Station reopened in 1950 under the name "Ishigami Station".

Station numbering was introduced to the Enoshima Electric Railway January 2014 with Ishigami being assigned station numbers EN02.

Passenger statistics
In fiscal 2019, the station was used by an average of 729 passengers daily, making it the least used of any of the Enoden stations 

The passenger figures for previous years are as shown below.

Surrounding area
Fujisawa Joint Government Building
Fujisawa City Concert Hall
Prince Chichibu Memorial Gymnasium
 Fujisawa Medical Center 
Fujisawa City South Civic Library

See also
 List of railway stations in Japan

References

External links

Enoden station information 

Railway stations in Kanagawa Prefecture
Railway stations in Japan opened in 1920
Railway stations in Fujisawa, Kanagawa